The Clinical Journal of Pain is a monthly peer-reviewed medical journal published by Lippincott Williams & Wilkins. It was established in 1985 and covers research on all aspects of pain management. According to the Journal Citation Reports, the journal has a 2018 impact factor of 2.893, ranking it 13th out of 29 journals in the category "Anesthesiology" and 82nd out of 191 journals in the category "Clinical Neurology".

References

External links
 

Publications established in 1985
Anesthesiology and palliative medicine journals
Lippincott Williams & Wilkins academic journals
English-language journals
Monthly journals